Haliotis fatui is a species of sea snail, a marine gastropod mollusk in the family Haliotidae, the abalones.

Description
The size of the subcircular to oval-oblong shell varies between 30 mm and 60 mm. It is closely related to Haliotis varia Linnaeus, 1758, but differs in its shell and epipodial characters. The coloration of the shell is brown, yellow brown or dark green.

Distribution
This marine species occurs in the central Indo-Pacific

References

  Geiger (1999), Description of Haliotis fatui new species (Gastropoda: Vetigastropoda) from the tropical western Pacific; The Nautilus v. 113

External links
 

fatui
Gastropods described in 1999